P.S. I Love You may refer to:

Literature 
PS, I Love You (novel), a 2004 novel by Cecelia Ahern
P.S. I Love You, a devotional book by H. Jackson Brown, Jr.
P.S. I Love You: An Intimate Portrait of Peter Sellers, a biography by Michael Sellers

Film and television 
 U. S. productions:
 P.S. I Luv U (1991), detective TV series
 P.S. I Love You (film) (2007), based on the Cecelia Ahern novel 
 "P.S. I Love You" (How I Met Your Mother) (2013), episode on TV
 Filipino productions (featuring Gabby Concepcion): 
P. S. I Love You (1981), film featuring Sharon Cuneta 
P. S. I Love You (TV series) (2011–2012), sequel to the film

Music 
PS I Love You (band), a Canadian indie-rock band

Albums
PS I Love You (album), a 2000 album by Kid 606

Songs
"P.S. I Love You" (1934 song), a 1934 song by Johnny Mercer and Gordon Jenkins
"P.S. I Love You" (Beatles song), a 1962 song by The Beatles
"P.S. I Love U" (Gackt song), a 2014 Japanese song by Gackt
"P.S. I Love You" (Robin Daggers song), a 2013 song by Robin Daggers from the television series How I Met Your Mother
"P.S. I Love You", a song by Curtis Mayfield from the 1976 album Give, Get, Take and Have
"P.S. I Love You", a song by Philippines' Sharon Cuneta
"P.S. I Love You", a song by Hins Cheung, a Chinese singer 
"P.S. I Love You", a song by Supper Moment, a Hong Kong band
"Chocolate Salty Balls (P.S. I Love You)", a 1998 song from the TV series South Park

Games 
Puffy: P.S. I Love You, a 1999 video game for PlayStation starring Japanese rock stars Puffy AmiYumi

See also
PS (disambiguation)